Daniel A. Vogt was a member of the Florida House of Representatives from 1856 until 1861 and was an outspoken advocate for secession before the American Civil War. He took in his nephews after the American Civil War.

One of the nephews he took in, Albertus Vogt, helped establish the phosphate driven land boom in Ocala.

Daniel Vogt's great great nephew John Vogt served as the President of the Florida Senate.

References

Year of birth unknown
Date of death unknown
Members of the Florida House of Representatives